Lula Divinia is the second studio album by American post-hardcore band Shiner. It was released in March 1997 on Hit It! Recordings, in partnership with DeSoto Records. The album was recorded at the Chicago Recording Company in the summer of 1996 and mixed in Kansas City by the band and Ken Waagner.

Critical reception
The Houston Press called the album a "teeth-jarring, brain-teasing mathematically precise [demonstration] of abrasive virtuosity." Orlando Weekly called it a "math-rock masterpiece." The Chicago Tribune wrote that the album "tastefully mixes catchy hooks, gnarled noise and old-fashioned sonic whomp into a King Creamson-ish blast."

Track listing
All songs written by Allen Epley and Shiner.
"The Situationist" – 4:44
"Christ Sized Shoes" – 2:52
"My Life as a Housewife" – 3:51
"Lula" – 4:04
"Third Gear Scratch" – 3:17
"Sideways" – 4:20
"Pinned" – 3:05
"Shelflife" – 2:38
"Jim's Lament" – 3:53
"Four Feet of Fence" – 5:10
"Cake" – 5:49
"Sleep It Off" – 4:23
"Two Black Eyes" – 6:23

Personnel
 Allen Epley – vocals, guitar
 Paul Malinowksi – bass guitar
 Tim Dow – drums
 Shiner – production

References

External links
 thirdgearscratch.net Lula Divinia

1997 albums
Shiner (band) albums